Noetiidae is a family of saltwater clams, marine bivalve molluscs in the order Arcida. They are related to the ark clams and used to be classified as among them. They are differentiated from the ark clams by the presence of striations on the hinge ligament and on the placement of this ligament. Like the ark clams, however, their shells range from ovate to elongate, are inflated, and are brown and white with clear radial ribs. They usually grow to around 6 cm in length, with a maximum of 10 cm.

Genera and species
Genera and species within the family Noetidae include:
 Arcopsis Koenen, 1885
 Arcopsis adamsi (Dall, 1886)
 Arcopsis fossularca
 Arcopsis gabinarca
 Arcopsis mulinarca
 Arcopsis ribriarca
 Arcopsis scapularca
 Arcopsis solida (Sowerby, 1833)
 Arcopsis spinearca
 Arcopsis verilarca
 Estellacar Iredale, 1939
 Noetia Gray, 1857
 Noetia alssoni
 Noetia bisulcata
 Noetia delgada (Lowe, 1935)
 Noetia lindae 
 Noetia ponderosa (Say, 1822)
 Noetia reversa (Sowerby, 1833)
 Noetiella
 Noetiella congoensis
 Rectangularca
 Scapularca
 Scelidionarca
 Sheldonella
 Sheldonella barbatiella
 Sheldonella didimacar
 Sheldonella minutalis
 Sheldonella paranoetia
 Stenocista
 Stenocista gambiensis
 Striarca
 Striarca afra
 Striarca breviarca
 Striarca estellacar
 Striarca galactella
 Striarca lactea
 Striarca pectunculiformis
 Trigonodesma
 Trinacria
 Verilarca
 Verilarca sinensis

References

 
Bivalve families